Ischnochiton comptus is a medium-sized polyplacophoran mollusc in the family Ischnochitonidae.

The species is 30 mm in size.

Distribution
Mainly distributed in the North Pacific region, such as: South Korea,  Taiwan, Mainland China, Japan especially in central Honshu.  Can be seen on rocks in intertidal zone and neritic zone.

See also
 Ischnochiton boninensis

References

Ischnochitonidae
Chitons described in 1859